Battle River Generating Station is a natural gas-fired power station owned by Heartland Generation, located near Forestburg, Alberta, Canada.  Formerly a coal-fired power station, the generating station transitioned off coal in 2021. Coal is provided by the Forestburg Collieries operated by West Moreland Coal, while natural gas is supplied by the Pembina Keephills Transmission pipeline.

Description
Units 1 and 2 were 32 MW coal-fired generating units that operated from 1954 until their retirement in 2000. Unit 3 supplied by Combustion Engineering and was commissioned late 1968 to early 1969 retired on December 31, 2019. Unit 3 was a 149 MW coal-fired unit that operated until its retirement on 31 December 2019. Unit 4 is a 155 MW unit that operates using 50% coal and 50% natural gas. Unit 5 is a 385 MW gas fired steam unit. Unit 4 is a candidate for future conversion to 100% natural gas.

The plant also features two large smokestacks, 161 m (528 ft) and 137 m (450 ft) in height.

See also 

 List of power stations in Canada
 List of tallest structures in Canada
 Coal in Canada
 Natural gas in Canada

References 

Coal-fired power stations in Alberta
County of Paintearth No. 18